Erlbach is a river of Bavaria, Germany.

The Erlbach springs south of Großkarolinenfeld. and discharges near the center of Großkarolinenfeld from the right into the Rott.

See also
List of rivers of Bavaria

References

Rivers of Bavaria
Rivers of Germany